The 2020 Major League Soccer season was the 25th season of Major League Soccer (MLS), the top professional soccer league in the United States and Canada. The regular season began on February 29, 2020, and was originally planned to end on October 4. The MLS Cup Playoffs were planned to begin later that month and would end with MLS Cup 2020 on November 7.

On March 12, 2020, the season entered a lengthy suspension due to the COVID-19 pandemic in North America, following the cancellation of several matches. On May 1, the league announced that players would be allowed to resume individual outdoor training at MLS facilities on May 6. The COVID-19 pandemic was the first interruption of regular season play since the 2001 MLS season, in which many late regular season games were canceled due to the September 11 attacks. On June 10, MLS announced that a bracket format dubbed the "MLS is Back Tournament" would begin July 8 at ESPN Wide World of Sports Complex in Walt Disney World, and end with the final on August 11. The tournament was eventually won by the Portland Timbers, who as a result earned a berth in the 2021 CONCACAF Champions League. The regular season later resumed a day after the tournament finished, and concluded on November 8. The playoffs began on November 20 with MLS Cup 2020 now being played on December 12.

The 2020 season saw the addition of two expansion clubs, Inter Miami CF and Nashville SC, which took Major League Soccer to 26 total teams. Nashville SC was initially placed in the Western Conference, for a 13-13 team balance, despite Nashville being to the east of the western most Eastern Conference team, Chicago Fire FC. However, after the MLS Is Back Tournament, COVID-19 difficulties led to MLS limiting teams to matches with teams in geographic proximity, and as a result Nashville was moved to the Eastern conference due to geography. This led to an imbalance, with 14 teams in the Eastern Conference and 12 in the Western Conference. Prior to the COVID-19 pandemic, this season was planned to be the first MLS season in which each team did not play every other team at least once, but, due to the pandemic, the schedule was heavily modified and most teams only played other teams within a regional geographic bubble. During the regular season around September and toward the end of the season, COVID-19 cross-border restrictions imposed by the Canadian government forced the Canadian MLS teams to play home matches in the United States.

Seattle Sounders FC were the defending champions, having defeated Toronto FC in MLS Cup 2019, while Los Angeles FC were the defending Supporters' Shield winners.

Philadelphia Union won the Supporters' Shield on the final day of the regular season, the first major trophy in the club's history.

Columbus Crew SC defeated defending champions Seattle Sounders FC in MLS Cup 2020 3–0 to win a second MLS Cup title, and their first since 2008.

Teams

Stadiums and locations

Two stadiums were renamed during the 2019–20 offseason:
 Avaya Stadium, home to the San Jose Earthquakes, was renamed Earthquakes Stadium on January 11, 2020. The team was unable to find a new naming rights partner after original stadium sponsor Avaya filed for bankruptcy.
 Talen Energy Stadium, home to the Philadelphia Union, was renamed Subaru Park on February 18. The Union's 2010 naming rights contract with PPL, which was inherited in 2015 by the PPL spinoff Talen Energy, expired after the 2019 season, and Subaru of America, the U.S. subsidiary of Japanese automaker Subaru, was announced as the new partner also on February 18.

An additional stadium was renamed prior to the 2020 postseason:
 CenturyLink Field, home to Seattle Sounders FC, was renamed to Lumen Field on November 19. The telecommunications company had changed its name from CenturyLink to Lumen Technologies the prior September.

Expansion team Nashville SC began the season in the MLS Western Conference. As part of the announcement of the MLS is Back Tournament, MLS confirmed that for one season only, Nashville would transfer to the MLS Eastern Conference which thereby expanded to 14 teams for the season, with the Western Conference reduced to 12. Due to travel restrictions between US and Canada the three Canadian teams were relocated to temporary stadiums in the United States starting September 20.

Personnel and sponsorship

Coaching changes

Regular season

Format
The 2020 regular season began on February 29, 2020, and was originally scheduled to conclude on October 4. The league was originally divided into two conferences of 13 teams, with each playing a 34-game schedule with 17 each of home and away matches. Each team would play their intra-conference opponents twice – once home and once away for a total of 24 matches – and one match against 10 of the members of the opposite conference. The 2020 season was the first MLS season in which each team did not play every other team at least once.

The MLS is Back Tournament introduced three regular season matches in the group stage and the knockout stage that did not count towards regular season standings. After the tournament, the "first phase" of the regular schedule restart had teams playing in their home markets against only conference opponents for six matches with the intent of finishing a 23-match season. Some teams were allowed to play in front of a limited audience of spectators. The exceptions in the first phase were that the Canadian clubs would play six matches between themselves due to prohibited travel to the United States and that FC Dallas and Nashville SC would play an additional three matches between themselves to make up for the fact that they could not play in the MLS is Back Tournament.

On September 11, the league announced the "second phase" of the restart with three more matches for each team. In this phase, Canadian and U.S. teams once again played each other but only within their own geographic bubble. This phase included two away games and one (designated home) game at a neutral venue for each of the Canadian teams; with Vancouver, Montreal, and Toronto hosting matches in Portland, Harrison, and Hartford, respectively.

On October 17, following a decision by the ISC (Independent Supporters Council), it was announced that the Supporters' Shield would not be awarded to the best regular season team in 2020. In an official announcement, the Supporters' Shield Foundation stated, "After much consideration and discussion, the Supporters' Shield Foundation has decided to forego awarding the Supporters' Shield for the 2020 season. This is not an easy decision to make. With the inability for supporters to be in attendance and fill their stadiums with passion, however, we feel as though the current climate goes against the spirit of the Shield." However, following backlash from members across the MLS community, on October 23 the foundation reversed the decision and reinstated the Shield.

On October 29, the league announced that the final regular season standings and playoff qualification would be determined by points per game rather than by overall points. This was due to eight MLS clubs, all in the Western Conference, being unable to play all of their scheduled 23 regular season matches in time due to the COVID-19 pandemic. Seven postponed matches were cancelled altogether in order for the playoffs to be able to start on the scheduled date.

The regular season concluded with Decision Day on November 8, after which an expanded 18-team playoff began on November 20 and concluded with MLS Cup 2020 on December 12. Eight teams from the Western Conference and six teams from the Eastern Conference automatically qualified for the playoffs; teams finishing in positions 7–10 in the Eastern Conference competed in a play-in round for the final two first round playoff spots.

Conference standings

Eastern Conference

Western Conference

Overall table
The leading team in this table wins the Supporters' Shield.

Fixtures and results

Playoffs

Attendance

Due to the pandemic, some games early in the season were played with low attendance, and games later in the season were played without fans, or with artificially reduced attendance. Individual teams could set their own attendance limits based on their local, regional and state regulations during the pandemic.

Average home attendances

Games without fans are not counted in averages or games played.

Note: Several additional matches had fans in attendance, but official figures have not yet been reported: Sporting Kansas City (8 home matches), Orlando City (8), FC Dallas (2), Philadelphia Union (3), Real Salt Lake (1), and Inter Miami CF (1).

Highest attendances 
Regular season

COVID-19 restrictions
Following the resumption of league play, some teams played either behind closed doors or with limited capacity based on local and state regulations.

Player statistics

Goals

Assists

Shutouts

Hat-tricks 

4 Scored 4 goals

Awards

Player of the Month

Player / Team of the Week
 Bold denotes League Player of the Week.

Goal of the Week

End-of-season awards

MLS Best XI

Player movement

Collective bargaining agreement
On February 6, 2020, MLS and the MLS Players Association agreed to a new five-year collective bargaining agreement (CBA) which will last through the 2024 season. The primary issues negotiated were increased player spending, expanded free agency, and more charter travel.

The new collective bargaining agreement saw the league increase player spending to around $11.6 million per club by 2024, with both senior and reserve minimum salaries receiving increases throughout the deal as well as player bonuses for winning games and tournaments. The league also reduced Targeted Allocation Money by redistributing it into General Allocation Money. In addition, the players would earn a share in any increases in the league's new media deal in 2023.

The Players Association also negotiated a significantly lower threshold for free agency, which was previously set at 28 years of age with eight years of service time in the league. Under the new agreement, the free agency requirement for players was set at 24 years of age, with five years of service time. The number of charter flights allowed for each team was increased from four legs to eight one-way trips in 2020, with future allowances up to 16 one-way trips by 2024. Each MLS team was also required to charter flights for all MLS Cup Playoffs matches and CONCACAF Champions League matches.

SuperDraft

At the MLS SuperDraft in January every year, Major League Soccer teams select players who have graduated from college or otherwise been signed by the league. The first two rounds of the 2020 MLS SuperDraft took place on January 9, 2020, and, unlike previous drafts, was held without a major event ceremony and was instead streamed on Twitter via ESPN. The third and fourth rounds were held via conference call on January 13.

Inter Miami CF and Nashville SC, as expansion clubs, held the first two spots in the SuperDraft. Clemson Tigers forward Robbie Robinson was selected with the first-overall pick by Inter Miami.

Allocation ranking
The allocation ranking was the mechanism used to determine which MLS club had first priority to acquire a player who was in the MLS allocation list. The MLS allocation list contained select U.S. national team players and players transferred outside of MLS garnering a transfer fee of at least $500,000. The allocations were ranked in reverse order of finish for the 2019 season, taking playoff performance into account.

Once the club used its allocation ranking to acquire a player, it dropped to the bottom of the list. A ranking could be traded provided that part of the compensation received in return was another club's ranking. At all times each club was assigned one ranking. The rankings reset at the end of each MLS season.

MLS is Back Tournament 

To prevent an outbreak of COVID-19 occurring during the season, a bracket tournament, dubbed the "MLS is Back Tournament", was announced on June 10. The tournament took place behind closed doors at the ESPN Wide World of Sports Complex located in the Walt Disney World Resort, in Bay Lake, Florida, with the regular season slated to begin following the tournament. The group stage of the tournament counted towards the regular season. MLS announced its plan to restart the 2020 season with all 26 MLS clubs competing in the MLS is Back Tournament at ESPN Wide World of Sports Complex at Walt Disney World Resort in Florida beginning July 8. The tournament, which was played without fans in attendance, provided.a compelling way for MLS to resume its 25th season. On July 6, FC Dallas withdrew from the tournament due to ten players and one staff member of the club testing positive for COVID-19, after their opening match was initially postponed. On July 9, Nashville SC were also withdrawn from the tournament after nine players of the club tested positive for the virus, after their opening match was initially postponed.

Each team played three group stage matches, and those results counted in the 2020 MLS regular season standings. After 16 consecutive days of group stage matches, the top two teams from each group along with the four best third-place finishers, moved on to the knockout stage. The knockout stage included a round of 16, quarter-finals, semi-finals, and the championship match which took place on August 11. Matches tied at the end of regulation in the knockout phase proceeded directly to a penalty shoot-out.

As MLS is Back Tournament winners, the Portland Timbers earned a spot in the 2021 CONCACAF Champions League. They replaced the berth previously awarded to the MLS regular season points leader in the conference opposite of the Supporters’ Shield winner.

In addition to matches that counted in the regular season standings and the Champions League berth, players had the opportunity to earn additional bonuses as part of a $1.1 million prize pool.

Groups

Knockout

See also
COVID-19 pandemic in Canada
COVID-19 pandemic in the United States
Impact of the COVID-19 pandemic on sports

References

External links

 

 
Major League Soccer
Major League Soccer
Major League Soccer seasons
Major League Soccer